The Roots of the Mountains: Wherein is Told Somewhat of the Lives of the Men of Burgdale, Their Friends, Their Neighbors, Their Foemen, and Their Fellows in Arms is a fantasy romance novel by William Morris, perhaps the first modern fantasy writer to unite an imaginary world with an element of the supernatural, and thus the precursor of much of present-day fantasy literature. It was first published in hardcover by Reeves and Turner in 1889. Its importance in the history of fantasy literature was recognized by its republication by the Newcastle Publishing Company as the nineteenth volume of the Newcastle Forgotten Fantasy Library in April, 1979.

According to Graham Seaman, "The Roots of the Mountains seems to be the story that inspired the subplot of the Dunedain, wanderers of a fading heroic past defending the frontiers of the Shire against the Orcs, and the loves of Aragorn, Eowyn, Faramir, and Arwen in Tolkien's Lord of the Rings."

This work and its predecessor, The House of the Wolfings, are to some degree historical novels, with little or no magic. Morris went on to develop the new genre established in these works in such later fantasies as The Wood Beyond the World, Child Christopher and Goldilind the Fair, The Well at the World's End, The Water of the Wondrous Isles and The Sundering Flood.

Plot summary
The story is set in Burgdale, a small Germanic settlement in a valley at the foot of a mountain range, and the neighbouring woodlands, pastures and dales. The area is inhabited by the interdependent Dalemen, who are weavers, smiths, and traders, the Woodlanders, who are hunters and carpenters, and the Shepherds. Their society is challenged by disruptions from the outside world in the form of the Sons of the Wolf, the descendants of the Wolfings from the previous novel, and the invading Dusky Men (the Huns). The Sons of the Wolf, driven from their original country by the Dusky Men, continue to resist the invaders as a frontier force guarding their new home. The somewhat troubled integration of the Sons of the Wolf into the society they are protecting is told in the story of five lovers representing both peoples, four of whom eventually marry.

Morris projected a sequel to The Roots of the Mountains to be called The Story of Desiderius, although it was never completed.

References

External links

1889 British novels
British fantasy novels
1889 fantasy novels
Novels by William Morris